Doug MacLeod (born April 21, 1946 in New York City, United States) is an American storytelling blues musician. Although now associated with his home in Memphis, he has lived and worked in North Carolina, St. Louis, New York, Los Angeles, and Norfolk, Virginia, where he was stationed in the United States Navy. He became acquainted with the blues in St Louis in his teens and started his career playing country blues on acoustic guitar, finding that singing eased a stutter and helped him to manage it. Although predominantly associated with acoustic guitar, his skills were developed as a blues bass player, and honed by his subsequent journeys into jazz and electric blues.

Influences
MacLeod's formative blues instruction is attributed to a man he knew as Ernest Banks who also gave him the guiding principles of his music and performances:
"Never play a note you don't believe"
"Never write or sing about what you don't know about"
He also formed a strong friendship with George "Harmonica" Smith who not only became his mentor, but also the source or experience for many of his songs and stories in his live performances. Unable or unwilling to use his correct name, George always called him "Dubb", a name also adopted by his loyal followers, the DubbHeads.

Writing
MacLeod plays only his own compositions (of which he is credited with over 300), but his music has also been recorded by many other artists, including Dave Alvin, James Armstrong, Eva Cassidy, Albert Collins,  Papa John Creach, Big Llou Johnson, Albert King, Chris Thomas King, Coco Montoya, Billy Lee Riley, Son Seals, Tabby Thomas, and Joe Louis Walker. His songs can be heard on the TV series 'The Heat Of The Night'.

He has also been a long-time contributor to Blues Revue magazine with his column "Doug's Back Porch".

The book Murder At The Crossroads: A Blues Mystery - co-authored with Debra B. Schiff in 2022.

Performance
MacLeod's live performances preserve the tradition of the blues as a story-telling medium, expressed by his soulful voice and powerfully rhythmic acoustic guitar style. He plays either his custom National M-1 he calls Moon or his Waterloo WL-S Deluxe he calls P-Nut (accompanied by his left foot), with stories or introductions between pieces. The tales come from his early performances when he felt that he did not have enough original music to fill a show. He has appeared in blues, folk, and jazz festivals and his own shows around the world, but particularly in the US, the UK, and Europe.

Other activities
As well as writing and performing, he also teaches guitar. Solid Air Records released his instructional DVD 101 Blues Guitar Essentials in 2006.. MacLeod has hosted blues radio shows Blues Highway and  Nothin' but the Blues (1999 to 2004), and was the voice for the Blues Showcase of Continental Airlines.

Recognition: He has won 6 Blues Music Awards
Acoustic Artist of the Year 2014, 2016, 2017 and 2020. 
Acoustic Album of the Year 2014 and 2018.

He has been nominated for several consecutive years for:
Best Song in 2006 ("Dubb's Talkin' Politician Blues"), in 2014 ("The Entitled Few") and in 2016 ("You Got It Good (and That Ain’t Bad)"), 
Acoustic Artist of the Year: 2008, 2009, 2010, 2011, 2012, 2013, 2014, 2015, 2016, 2017., 2018, 2020, 2021, 2022, and 2023.
Acoustic Album of the Year in 2012 (Brand New Eyes), 2014 (There's a Time), 2016 (Exactly Like This) and 2018 (Break The Chain).
Historical Album in 2017 (Live in Europe).

Winner of the 2013  Blues Blast Award for Male Blues Artist Of The Year.

Nominated for the 2022 Blues Blast Music Award for Acoustic Guitar.

The album A Soul To Claim a 2022 Downbeat Magazine Album Of The Year.

He received the Golden Note award for Best Original Recording (for his album You Can't Take My Blues). His songs have featured in Grammy Award-nominated albums: Albert King's I'm in a Phone Booth, Baby (1984) ("Your Bread Ain't Done"), and Albert Collins' Cold Snap (1986) ("Cash Talking, The Working Man’s Blues").

Discography
Plaquemine (Single-Sledgehammer Blues) 2023
A Soul To Claim (Reference Recordings) 2022
Send The Soul On Home  (Single-Under The Radar Music Group) 2019
Lobby Money (Single- Under The Radar Music Group) 2018
Break the Chain (Reference Recordings) 2017
Live in Europe (Under the Radar Music Group) 2016
Plowin' Mule Remix (Single -Black & Tan) 2016
Doug MacLeod Remixed EP (Black & Tan) 2016
Exactly Like This (Reference Recordings) 2015
A Double Dose Of Dubb EP (Black & Tan) 2015
The Roots Of It All Acoustic Blues The Definitive Collection Vol. 4 (Bear Family Productions) 2014
There's a Time (Reference Recordings) 2013
Night Walking Remix (Single- Black & Tan) 2013
Come to Find - Reissue (APO) 2013
Doug MacLeod Direct-To-Disc (APO) 2012
The Devil Is Beating His Wife Remix (Single-Black & Tan) 2011
Brand New Eyes (Fresh! from RR) 2011
The Utrecht Sessions (Black & Tan) 2008
Live at XM Radio vol. 2 (Black & Tan) 2007
Live at XM Satellite (Black & Tan) 2007
Where I Been (Black & Tan) 2006
Dubb (Black & Tan) 2005
A Little Sin (Black & Tan) 2002
101 Blues Guitar Essentials (instructional DVD) (Solid Air Record / Alfred Publishing) 2006
Bluesquest (Sledgehammer Blues (formerly AudioQuest Music) 2006
Whose Truth, Whose Lies (Sledgehammer Blues (formerly AudioQuest Music)) 2000
Live As It Gets (with John "Juke" Logan) (Mocombo Records) 1999
Unmarked Road (Sledgehammer Blues (formerly AudioQuest Music)) 1997
Blues Masters (Sledgehammer Blues (formerly AudioQuest Music) 1996
You Can't Take My Blues (Sledgehammer Blues (formerly AudioQuest Music)) 1996
Works Of Art (Sledgehammer Blues (formerly AudioQuest Music) 1994
Come to Find (Sledgehammer Blues (formerly AudioQuest Music)) 1994
Live in 1991 vol. 1 (Black & Tan) 1991
Live in 1991 vol. 2 (Black & Tan) 1991
Ain't The Blues Evil (Volt/Fantasy) 1991
54th and Vermont (Stomp) 1989
Woman In The Street (Stomp) 1987
No Road Back Home (Hightone) 1984

Recorded with 
 Rhythm Blues & Boogie / Dave Keyes / (Blue Heart Records) 2022
 They Call Me Uncle Mick / Mick Kolassa / (Endless Blues) 2022
 Two Sides / Kirsten Thien / (Screen Door Records) 2020
 Pick Your Choice / George Harmonica Smith / (Shoe Label Records) 2014
 Get Your Nose Out Of My Business / Rich DelGrosso / (CD Baby) 2005
 Slide Guitar for August Wilson's play The Gem Of The Ocean 2003
 Early Hours / Pee Wee Crayton / (Blind Pig) 1999
 Now You Can Talk About Me / George Harmonica Smith / (Blind Pig) 1998
 Dark Night / James Armstrong / (Hightone) 1998
 Naked Heart / Susan J Paul / (Sugar Bone) 1997
 East Side Story / Kid Frost  / (Virgin) 1992
 The Ladies And The Babies / Frankie Lee (Hightone) 1984
 Make Room For Pee Wee / Pee Wee Crayton (Murray Bros) 1983

Books 
Who Is Blues Vol.1 - Doug MacLeod. 2018

Film appearances
MacLeod appeared in Resonate: A Guitar Story along with Catfish Keith, Bob Brozman and Mike Dowling. Resonate is a story of contemporary players of National Reso-Phonic Guitars.

References

External links
 Official website
YouTube
Bandsintown

1946 births
Living people
American blues guitarists
American male guitarists
Singers from New York City
American blues singer-songwriters
Singer-songwriters from California
Guitarists from Los Angeles
Guitarists from New York City
20th-century American guitarists
20th-century American male musicians
American male singer-songwriters
Singer-songwriters from New York (state)